César Felipe Millán Favela (born August 27, 1969) is a Mexican-American dog trainer. He is widely known for his Emmy-nominated television series Dog Whisperer with Cesar Millan, which was produced from 2004 to 2012 and is broadcast in more than 80 countries worldwide.

Millan is a New York Times best-selling author and has his own line of dog products and instructional DVDs. Prior to The Dog Whisperer series, Millan focused on rehabilitating severely aggressive dogs and founded a rehab complex, the Dog Psychology Center, in South Los Angeles (2002–2008).

Millan's first three books, including Cesar's Way, all became New York Times best sellers, have cumulatively sold two million copies in the United States, and are available in 14 other countries.

With Ilusión Millan, his former wife, he founded the Millan Foundation – later renamed the Cesar Millan Foundation and currently called the Cesar Millan PACK Project. The foundation was established to provide financial support to animal shelters and organizations engaged in the rescuing, rehabilitating, and re-homing of abused and abandoned animals, and to fund spay/neuter programs.

Early life
Millan was born on August 27, 1969, to Felipe Millán Guillen and María Teresa Favela in rural Culiacán, Sinaloa, Mexico. Millan grew up working with animals on the farm in Sinaloa where his grandfather, Teodoro Millán Ángulo, was a tenant farmer. Because of his natural way with dogs, he was called el Perrero, "the dog herder". The family later moved to Mazatlán.

Millan illegally crossed the border into the United States when he was 21 years old, speaking no English and with only US$100. In an interview with long-time friend Jada Pinkett Smith in July 2018, Millan described his harrowing journey. 
 On crime along the Mexican border: "Once you get to the border, what you see is wanted to take advantage of you. So that's when you learn about the streets. But that's another level of streets. They can sell you. They can kill you for organs. That is more likely than jumping it." 
 On United States Border Patrol: "There were many times I let the border patrol catch me because Americans feed you. So when they catch you, they feed you. Mexican police don't feed you." 
 On his friendship with Jada Pinkett Smith: Millan met her shortly after arriving in Los Angeles and confided in her his dreams of working with pets on television; she told him that he needed to learn English and set up one of her friends to teach him. "Because of Jada, I speak English."

Career
Millan's first job in the United States was at a dog grooming store He later created the Pacific Point Canine Academy. Jada Pinkett Smith became one of Millan's first clients and supporters when he was working as a limousine driver, providing him with an English tutor for a year. Subsequently, Millan created the Dog Psychology Center, a two-acre (0.81 ha) facility in South Los Angeles, specializing in working with large breed dogs. In 2009, the Dog Psychology Center moved to Santa Clarita, California. Millan also opened an East Coast clinic at the Country Inn Pet Resort in Davie, Florida, near Fort Lauderdale.

In 2002, after a profile in the Los Angeles Times, Millan worked with MPH Entertainment, Inc. developing a television pilot for Dog Whisperer, a reality television series that follows Millan as he works in the field of dog rehabilitation. The series premiered on September 13, 2004, on the National Geographic Channel, subsequently moving to the Nat Geo WILD channel. The show would become National Geographic's No. 1 show during its first season and was broadcast in more than eighty countries worldwide during its run. The final episode of the show was broadcast in the U.S. on September 15, 2012.

In 2009, in conjunction with IMG, Millan introduced a monthly magazine also titled Cesar's Way, with The Wall Street Journal reporting at that time that half of American consumers recognized Millan. The magazine combined advice from Millan along with articles about the relationship between dogs and humans. The magazine ceased publication after its November/December 2014 issue.

Cesar Millan's Leader of the Pack was an American documentary television series on the Nat Geo Wild channel which ran from January 5, 2013 to March 26, 2013. The next year, 2014, saw the premiere of Millan's new series, Cesar 911, on the Nat Geo WILD channel; in non-American markets, it is known as Cesar to the Rescue. In 2015, he teamed up with children's television veterans Sid and Marty Krofft to create Mutt & Stuff, a preschool television show for the Nickelodeon channel. Millan's son Calvin stars in the series. In 2017, Millan and his older son Andre appeared in a new series Cesar Millan's Dog Nation, which ran for one season starting on March 3.

Cesar Millan Live!
"Cesar Millan Live!" is an international touring dog training lecture and stage performance where Millan presents his techniques and philosophy from his television shows and books in front of a live audience. The show consists of one-half lecture and one-half demonstration with local shelter dogs, in which he uses his pack-leader training techniques to modify negative behaviors.

Dog training technique
Millan's work focuses on handling a dog with what he calls "calm-assertive energy". He believes that dog owners should establish their role as calm-assertive pack leaders. According to Millan, dogs have three primary needs: exercise, discipline and affection, in that order. In other words, it is the owner's responsibility to fulfill the dog's energy level needs through challenging exercise; then to provide clearly communicated rules, boundaries and limitations; and finally, to provide affection. 

According to Millan, a common pitfall for American dog owners is to give a great deal of affection with very little exercise and even less discipline. He encourages owners to understand the effect their own attitudes, internal emotions and physical postures have on a dog's behavior, counseling owners to hold strong posture (i.e., shoulders high and chest forward) and to project energy that is calm-assertive.

Millan's TV programs are centered on the rehabilitation of dogs while Millan concurrently educates the dog owners in his dog-handling philosophy. Conversations with owners typically revolve around his philosophy: that healthy, balanced dogs require strong "pack leadership" from their owners, while Millan demonstrates how owners can achieve and maintain a leadership role with their dogs.

In some cases, Millan takes dogs with severe behavioral problems to his Dog Psychology Center for an extended period of more intensive rehabilitation. The programs are not intended as a dog training guide, and each episode contains repeated warnings that viewers should not try the behavior modification techniques at home without the guidance of a professional.

While working with a dog, Millan often uses vocal marks such as tsch, gestures, and body language to communicate with dogs rather than speech or the dog's name. Millan encourages owners to create their own unique sound that works for them. He believes that dogs sense, understand, and respond to a person's energy more easily than their speech.

Millan has said, "My goal in rehabilitating dogs and training people is to create balanced relationships between humans and canines." In 2009, The New York Times attributed Millan's success to his personal sense of balance, describing this as "a sort of über-balanced mien".

Criticism
According to a January 2007 article in the Indian scientific journal Current Science, some professional Indian dog trainers find Millan's methods outdated, flawed and "unscientific and inhumane."  Millan's detractors say that what Millan calls "calm submission" is in reality a state of helplessness that is the result of adverse dog training techniques. Malcolm Gladwell, writing in The New Yorker, said that critics were responding to the "highly edited" version of Millan's approach shown on television, which exaggerates the frequency and intensity that he uses when he disciplines the dogs.

In October 2012, Millan appeared on The Alan Titchmarsh Show. Titchmarsh called his methods "cruel" and "unnecessary", citing a video in which, Titchmarsh said, Millan punched a dog in the throat. Millan called it a touch, not a punch. Titchmarsh read out an RSPCA statement saying that "Adverse training techniques which have been seen to be used by Cesar Millan can cause pain and fear for dogs and may worsen their behavioural problems."

In March 2016 American Humane Association responded to complaints about an episode on a Nat Geo reality television series stating that the treatment of the animals did not meet their “Guidelines for the Safe Use of Animals in Filmed Media.”

in 2016 AVSAB American Veterinary Society of Animal Behavior published a response to the airing of the popular TV show Cesar 911, in which a dog being trained by Cesar Millan attacked and injured a pig and stated, "When the problem behavior involves a negative reaction to another animal, attempting to elicit the bad behavior so it can be “corrected” is not only ineffective, it puts the target animal at risk of injury. Such training methods are unacceptable."

Personal life
Millan became a permanent resident of the United States in 2000, and became a United States citizen in 2009. He lives in Los Angeles, California.

He married Ilusión Wilson in 1994, with whom he has two sons. In May 2010, after his dog Daddy died in February and he learned of his wife's intent to divorce him, Millan attempted suicide. In June 2010, Ilusión Millan filed for divorce.

In August 2010, he began a relationship with Jahira Dar, an actress and former stylist and wardrobe consultant. The couple announced their engagement in April 2016.

Daddy and Junior 
 
One of Millan's many dogs, Daddy, was an American Pit Bull Terrier integral to Millan's work and his television series, The Dog Whisperer. Millan later selected another pit bull puppy, Junior, as Daddy's protégé — to apprentice, learn his temperament and prepare to assume Daddy's role after his death. Daddy's death came at age 16 in February 2010. After the death of Daddy, Junior assumed Daddy's role and helped Millan with rehabilitating dogs by using what Millan refers to as calm, assertive energy. Junior died on July 21, 2021. Cesar announced his passing in a video titled 'A Tribute To My Best Friend (Junior Millan)' on his YouTube channel.

Legal issues 

In 2006, Millan was sued by a television producer who claimed his dog was choked and forced to run on a treadmill at Millan’s Dog Psychology Center. In 2015, Millan was sued by a Florida nurse after she was attacked by a dog that Millan had released from his Dog Psychology Center earlier that week. In 2017 Millan was sued by gymnast Lidia Matiss who claimed that Millan's dog attacked her and killed Queen Latifah's dog. Millan publicly denied claims that his pit bull, Junior, killed Queen Latifah's dog.

In Media

In popular culture
A satirized version of Millan was portrayed in "Tsst", the May 3, 2006, episode of the Comedy Central animated series South Park. In the episode, Liane Cartman enlists Millan's help in applying his principles to her misbehaving son, Eric Cartman. The principles work and Eric temporarily becomes completely reformed. However, in the end when he refuses to go on an outing with his mother, she caves in to his demands in order to persuade him to go along with her, thus reverting his behavior to its original state. In 2010, when Millan was asked if he was offended at all by the episode, he stated that the creators of the show (Trey Parker and Matt Stone) contacted him to inform him of their intentions beforehand and that he found the episode fantastic. Millan reacted to the episode in a video posted on November 13, 2019 to his YouTube channel.

Millan made a guest appearance presenting clues in a category in the April 27, 2011 episode of Jeopardy!

Filmography

Bibliography

Videography

 Cesar Millan's Mastering Leadership Series, Volume 1: People Training for Dogs (2005)
 Cesar Millan's Mastering Leadership Series, Volume 2: Becoming a Pack Leader (2006)
 Cesar Millan's Mastering Leadership Series, Volume 3: Your New Dog: First Day and Beyond (2007)
 Cesar Millan's Mastering Leadership Series, Volume 4: Sit and Stay the Cesar Way (2008)
 Cesar Millan's Mastering Leadership Series, Volume 5: Common Canine Misbehaviors (2009)
 Cesar Millan's Mastering Leadership Series, Volume 6: Raising the Perfect Puppy (2010)
 Dog Whisperer with Cesar Millan – The Complete First Season (2006)
 Dog Whisperer with Cesar Millan – The Complete Second Season (2007)
 Dog Whisperer with Cesar Millan – The Complete Third Season (2008)
 Dog Whisperer with Cesar Millan – Celebrity Edition (2008)
 Dog Whisperer with Cesar Millan – The Complete Fourth Season, Volume 1 (2010)
 Dog Whisperer with Cesar Millan – The Complete Fourth Season, Volume 2 (2010)
 Dog Whisperer with Cesar Millan – Season 5 (2011)
 Dog Whisperer with Cesar Millan – Season 6 (2009)
 Cesar Millan's Leader of the Pack (2013)
 Cesar Millan: Love My Pit Bull (2014)
 Essentials of Dog Behavior, Volume 1: Socialization (2014)
 Essentials of Dog Behavior, Volume 2: The Language of Dogs (2015)
 Cesar Millan: Viva Las Vegas (2015)
 "Mutt & Stuff, Season 1" (2015)
 "Mutt & Stuff, Season 2" (2016)

References

External links

 
 The Cesar Millan Foundation
 

1969 births
Dog trainers
Living people
American television personalities of Mexican descent
Mexican emigrants to the United States
People from Culiacán
People with acquired American citizenship